Qeshlaq-e Ayaq Ayiri Hajj Mohammad Ali (also Romanized as Qeshlāq-e Āyāq Āyīrī Ḩājj Moḩammad ʿAlī) is a village in Qeshlaq-e Gharbi Rural District, Aslan Duz District, Parsabad County, Ardabil Province, Iran. At the 2006 census, its population was 55, in 9 families.

References 

Towns and villages in Parsabad County